Mark Bonner may refer to:
 Mark Bonner (footballer) (born 1974), English footballer
 Mark Bonner (football manager) (born 1985), English football head coach

See also
 Mark Bonnar (born 1968), Scottish actor